Nathan Blissett (born 29 June 1990) is an English professional footballer who plays as a forward, for Northern Premier League Premier Division club Stafford Rangers. He has made appearances for Kidderminster Harriers, Cambridge United, Bristol Rovers, Tranmere Rovers, Torquay United, Plymouth Argyle, Macclesfield Town, Solihull Moors and Maidenhead United.

Club career
Born in West Bromwich, Blissett had youth spells at Staffordshire University and Kidsgrove Athletic. He joined Romulus in the 2011 summer, after having a successful trial, and scored 13 goals in his only season at the club.

On 17 August 2012 Blissett signed a one-year deal with Conference Premier side Kidderminster Harriers. On 4 March of the following year, after being rarely used, he joined fellow league team Cambridge United in a one-month loan deal, with Michael Gash moving in the opposite direction.

Blissett also had two loan stints at Hednesford Town in 2014. On 20 November of that year he joined Bristol Rovers; initially in a loan deal, he signed permanently in January 2015.

After achieving promotion with Bristol Rovers in 2015, Blissett was loaned to Tranmere Rovers on 21 August. He returned to his parent club in October, and made his Football League debut on 20 October, coming on as a second-half substitute for Matt Taylor in a 0–0 home draw against Notts County.

Whilst at Bristol Rovers, the forward was loaned out to both Tranmere Rovers and Lincoln City. He played 5 times (scoring once) for Tranmere, and played 3 times for Lincoln.

Torquay United
On 14 January 2016 Nathan penned an eighteen-month contract with Torquay with the agreement being initially until the end of the season, with the option of another year. He made 17 appearances for Torquay in which he scored 8 goals. In the 2016–17 season, Blissett played half a season for Torquay before making the move up to League 2 with promotion hopefuls Plymouth Argyle.

Plymouth Argyle
In the January transfer window of the 2016–17 season, Nathan Blissett signed a deal with Plymouth Argyle worth £15,000. He was the first player to have a fee paid by Argyle since 2012. Blissett scored his first goal for the club in a 1–1 draw away to Wycombe Wanderers.

Macclesfield Town 
On 15 January 2018, Blissett joined Macclesfield Town on a loan until the end of the season. Blissett went on to score 5 goals in 16 appearances, helping Macclesfield Town to win the National League. After his release from Plymouth Argyle, Blissett went on to sign a permanent deal with Macclesfield Town.

Solihull Moors
On Friday 21 December 2018, Blissett signed for National League side Solihull Moors on a deal until the end of the 2019–20 season. He made his debut for the club on 26 December 2018, in a 4–0 away victory at Chesterfield in which he scored the opening two goals. In all, Blissett scored 15 times in 52 games for Solihull. He was released at the end of the 2019–20 season.

Maidenhead United
Blissett joined Maidenhead United on 25 July 2020. He left the Magpies at the end of the 2021-22 season, after nine goals in 59 games.

AFC Telford United
In June 2022, Blissett joined National League North club AFC Telford United.

Stafford Rangers
On 25 February 2023, Blissett signed for Northern Premier League Premier Division club Stafford Rangers having been released by AFC Telford United the previous day.

Personal life
Blissett's uncle, Luther Blissett, was also a footballer and a forward. He notably represented Watford, Bournemouth, Milan and Derry City, aside from appearing in 14 matches and scoring three goals for England at full international level.

Blissett qualified as a mortgage and insurance provider in 2021.

Career statistics

Honours
Bristol Rovers
Conference Premier play-offs: 2014–15

Plymouth Argyle
EFL League Two runner-up: 2016–17

Macclesfield Town
National League: 2017–18

References

External links

1990 births
Living people
Sportspeople from West Bromwich
English footballers
Association football forwards
Romulus F.C. players
Kidderminster Harriers F.C. players
Cambridge United F.C. players
Hednesford Town F.C. players
Bristol Rovers F.C. players
Tranmere Rovers F.C. players
Lincoln City F.C. players
Torquay United F.C. players
Plymouth Argyle F.C. players
Macclesfield Town F.C. players
Solihull Moors F.C. players
Maidenhead United F.C. players
AFC Telford United players
National League (English football) players
English Football League players
Black British sportsmen